Lwakhakha, sometimes spelled Lwakaka, is a town in Bungoma County, Kenya.

Location
This location is immediately east of Lwakhakha, Uganda, across the International border that divides the two towns. The coordinates of Lwakhakha, Kenya are:0° 47' 24.00"N, 34° 22' 48.00"E (Latitude:0.7900; Longitude:34.3800).

Overview
Lwakhakha, Kenya is a market town. Trans-border trade occurs, but much of it is informal and goes unrecorded. The town is connected to Kenya's national electricity grid. Arrangements are in the advanced stages to supply electricity to Lwakhakha, Uganda from Kenya, under the auspices of the East African Community. The area around Lwakhakha, Kenya has, in the past, served as a base for rebels opposed to the Kenyan Government in Nairobi.

Population
, the population of Lwakhakha, Kenya is not publicly known.

See also
Lwakhakha, Uganda

References

External links
Location of Lwakhakha, Kenya At Google Maps

Bungoma County
Populated places in Rift Valley Province
Cities in the Great Rift Valley
Kenya–Uganda border crossings